The 2010 Sheikh Jassim Cup was the 32nd edition of the league cup competition for football teams from Qatar.

Umm-Salal were the defending champions.

Round One Groups 
14 clubs were drawn into 4 groups of 4 or 5 teams. The winners qualify for the semi-finals.

All group games are played in one 'host' location, instead of the common home and away format used in other competitions

Final standings

Group A

Group B

Group C

Group D

Semi-finals

Final

2010
2010–11 in Qatari football
2010 domestic association football cups